Marvin Potzmann (born 7 December 1993) is an Austrian footballer who plays for LASK in the Austrian Bundesliga.

Career
On 9 May 2018, he played as Sturm Graz beat Red Bull Salzburg in extra time to win the 2017–18 Austrian Cup.

Honours
 2017/18 Austrian Cup

References

External links

Marvin Potzmann at ÖEFB

Austrian footballers
1993 births
Living people
SV Mattersburg players
SV Grödig players
SK Sturm Graz players
SK Rapid Wien players
LASK players
Austrian Football Bundesliga players
Austrian Regionalliga players
Association football midfielders